Abdul Wahed is a Bangladesh Jamaat-e-Islami politician and the former Member of Parliament of Kushtia-2.

Career
Wahed was elected to parliament from Kushtia-2 as a Bangladesh Jamaat-e-Islami candidate in 1986.

References

Bangladesh Jamaat-e-Islami politicians
Living people
3rd Jatiya Sangsad members
Year of birth missing (living people)